Wei Tao-ming (October 28, 1899 – May 18, 1978) was a distinguished Chinese diplomat and public servant. He was prominent as the Republic of China's Ambassador to the United States during the Second World War and foreign minister during the years in which the People's Republic of China sought to oust the ROC from the United Nations. He was also the first civilian Governor of Taiwan Province (1947–1949), replacing Governor General Chen Yi.

Early life
Wei Tao-ming was born in Kiukiang (Jiujiang), Kiangsi province in 1899. His father, Wei Tiao-yuan, was an affluent educator and active member of Dr. Sun Yat-sen's revolutionary movement. Wei Tao-ming's early schooling was at a missionary school, though he graduated from Kiangsi First Middle School in 1918. He then studied French in Peking for a year before moving to France in 1919. He obtained his doctorate in law from the University of Paris in 1926 and returned to China to pursue a legal career in Shanghai.

Political career

He became involved with the Kuomintang. At the age of 29, Wei became the youngest president of the Judicial Yuan. From 1930 to 1931, Wei served as mayor of special municipality of Nanking, then capital of the Republic of China.

As Ambassador to the United States from September 1942 to 1946, Wei was instrumental in securing American material and military support for the Republic of China as it resisted Japanese invasion and Communist insurgency. His public declarations were frequently covered by the New York Times, and he accompanied Madame Chiang Kai-shek during her highly successful visits to Washington, DC and New York. He resigned his post in October 1945, citing personal reasons, and was succeeded by Wellington Koo, then Ambassador to the Court of St. James.

Wei Taoming's wife christened the SS China Victory in 1944. The Ceremony had both an ancient Chinese invocation to the sea gods and the traditional American tradition of a bottle of champagne breaking. 
The matron of honor at the launching was Mrs. T. K. Chang, wife of the Chinese consul at Los Angeles.  SS China Victory was the first of a long line of Victory ships to leave the Calship building.

During his tenure as Governor of Taiwan Province, Wei created the Departments of Civil Affairs (民政廳), Finance (財政廳), Construction (建設廳), and Education (教育廳). He also employed thirteen members on the provincial board (省政委員), including those who were Taiwanese-born. He became the minister of foreign affairs after being the Governor (position succeeded by Chen Tsyr-shiou).

After the fall of mainland China to Communist rebels, Wei spent some time in Hong Kong, then made his way back to Taiwan.

Wei served as foreign minister of the Republic of China during the 1960s and was very active in maintaining U.S. support for Taipei. He also maintained a coalition in the United Nations General Assembly to reject membership for the People's Republic of China. He resigned due to health reason in 1971 as Peking's campaign to oust the ROC from the United Nations was on the verge of succeeding.

He was married to Tcheng Yu-hsiu (鄭毓秀) (aka Madame Wei Tao-Ming, Soumay Tcheng) (1891-1959). She was the first female lawyer and judge in Chinese history. She earned her doctoral degree in law at the Sorbonne in France and was the first Chinese person, male or female, to practice law at the French extraterritorial courts in Shanghai. Cheng was also one of the revolutionaries involved in the attempted assassination of military official and politician Yuan Shih-k'ai, commonly reviled in Chinese history for taking advantage of both the Ch'ing imperial court and the Republicans. She advocated women having their own voices and choices in marriage, and wrote it into the Republic of China's law. Her autobiography, My Revolutionary Years (1944), was published while her husband was Ambassador to the United States, and is revered as one of the best first hand accounts of modern Chinese history.

He died in Taipei on May 18, 1978 at the age 79.

References

External links
 http://paper.sznews.com/szdaily/20070416/ca2639935.htm

Mayors of Nanjing
Republic of China politicians from Jiangxi
1899 births
1978 deaths
Ambassadors of the Republic of China to the United States
Senior Advisors to President Chiang Kai-shek
Senior Advisors to President Chiang Ching-kuo
Taiwanese Ministers of Foreign Affairs
Politicians from Jiujiang
Kuomintang politicians in Taiwan
Chairpersons of the Taiwan Provincial Government
Chinese expatriates in France